Francisco José González Expósito (born 19 September 1976), commonly known as Kiko Ratón, is a Spanish footballer who plays for CD Puerto Cruz as a striker.

He amassed Segunda División totals of 166 matches and 27 goals over six seasons, representing in the competition Tenerife, Hércules and Girona.

Club career
Born in Puerto de la Cruz, Province of Santa Cruz de Tenerife, Ratón finished his development at local CD Tenerife, playing his first years in the fourth division or lower and having also appeared for the club's reserves. He made his professional debut in the 2002–03 season in the second level, aged 26.

After three seasons with Tenerife, Ratón moved to second-tier side Hércules CF, appearing very rarely through one sole campaign. He resumed his career in division three with Orihuela CF, and scored 21 goals in his second year, second overall in all four groups.

Ratón then had one assuming experience abroad, joining Greek team Iraklis Thessaloniki F.C. in the summer of 2008. He returned home after just one year with Girona FC, achieving, at the age of 33, his best season as a professional as the Catalans narrowly avoided relegation from the second tier.

Ratón continued to play well into his 40s, in the lower leagues and amateur football.

References

External links

1976 births
Living people
Footballers from Puerto de la Cruz
Spanish footballers
Association football forwards
Segunda División players
Segunda División B players
Tercera División players
CD Tenerife B players
UD Vecindario players
CD Tenerife players
Hércules CF players
Orihuela CF players
Girona FC players
CD Eldense footballers
Super League Greece players
Iraklis Thessaloniki F.C. players
Spanish expatriate footballers
Expatriate footballers in Greece
Spanish expatriate sportspeople in Greece